Sir George Stuart Robertson  (25 May 1872 in London, England – 29 January 1967 in London, England) was a British barrister, public servant, athlete, tennis player, and classical scholar.  He competed at the 1896 Summer Olympics in Athens.

Biography
Robertson was educated at Winchester College and New College, Oxford, where he had won the Gaisford Prize for Greek Verse in 1894 and an Oxford Blue for hammer throwing. In 1896, he saw an advertisement in the window of a London travel agent, and later explained "Greek classics were my proper academic field, so I could hardly resist a go at the Olympics, could I?" Robertson paid £11 to travel to Athens for the inaugural modern games. On arrival there, he was dismayed to find that hammer throwing, the discipline he was most proficient in, was not to be competed in at the games. However, in the spirit of amateurism he entered for the shot put and the discus instead.

In the discus throw, he came fourth, with a distance of 25.20 metres; the worst result ever recorded in the Olympics discus.

In the singles tennis tournament, Robertson was defeated in the first round by Konstantinos Paspatis of Greece.  This put him in a six-way tie for eighth (last) in the field of thirteen competitors. In the tennis doubles, Robertson partnered the Australian Edwin Flack.  The pair received a bye in the first round, advancing them to the semi-finals and guaranteeing them a top three place before they had played a game.  They lost their semifinal match to Dionysios Kasdaglis of Egypt and Demetrios Petrokokkinos of Greece, finishing third.

Robertson is also remembered for his performance in the ceremony which followed the games, when he recited an ode to athletic prowess which he had composed in Ancient Greek; this feat was rewarded by the King of Greece who bestowed an olive and laurel wreath.

He had a successful career after athletics. He was called to the Bar by the Middle Temple  in 1899. He served as Chief Registrar of Friendly Societies (1912 to 1937) and as Industrial Assurance Commissioner (1923 to 1937), and was also a director of the Prudential Assurance Company. He was knighted in the 1928 Birthday Honours.

References

External links

1872 births
1967 deaths
19th-century British people
19th-century male tennis players
People educated at Winchester College
Alumni of New College, Oxford
Athletes (track and field) at the 1896 Summer Olympics
19th-century sportsmen
British male tennis players
British male discus throwers
Olympic athletes of Great Britain
Olympic bronze medallists for Great Britain
Olympic tennis players of Great Britain
British male shot putters
Tennis players at the 1896 Summer Olympics
Olympic medalists in tennis
Medalists at the 1896 Summer Olympics
Knights Bachelor
Members of the Middle Temple
Place of birth missing
Athletes from London
Tennis people from Greater London
20th-century King's Counsel
Fellows of the Society of Antiquaries of London